Carmel Valley Village is an unincorporated community and census-designated place (CDP) in Monterey County, California, United States. In 1946, Byington Ford and Tirey L. Ford Jr. developed the Carmel Valley Village, which included an airpark, shops, and homes. At the time of the 2020 census the CDP population was 4,524, up from 4,407 at the 2010 census. In November 2009, a majority of residents voted against incorporation.

History
The Rancho Los Laureles, a  Mexican land grant in present-day Monterey County, was given in 1839 by Governor Juan Bautista Alvarado to José Manuel Boronda and Vicente Blas Martínez. The grant extended along the Carmel River and the Carmel Valley, and encompassed present-day Carmel Valley Village. In 1882, the Pacific Improvement Company (PIC) purchased the Rancho Los Laureles. In 1916, Samuel F.B. Morse became the manager of the PIC; his job was to liquidate the PIC holdings. In 1919, Morse formed the Del Monte Properties and acquired PIC. In 1923, the Del Monte Properties divided the land into 11 parcels. Marion Hollins bought . In 1926, developer Frank B. Porter bought . He later acquired a portion of the Hollins ranch and sold it to Byington Ford. Ford and his wife Marion used  as a summer ranch and named it Moon Trail Ranch. It was located at Via Las Encinas in Carmel Valley.

In 1946, Byington Ford and his brother, Tirey Ford Jr., developed the "Airway Village" that years later was renamed the Carmel Valley Village. It included an Airway Market. By 1947, the Airway General Store, barbershop, drug store (with soda fountain), beauty shop, Stirrup Cup bar, and the Grapevine liquor store had been built. All were in walking distance of the Airpark and decorated to resemble a Mexican village. Artist Bruce Ariss painted murals on each store to resemble a Spanish village.

Ford and his brother developed the Carmel Valley Airfield for pilot-owners who would want to be "at home a minute or two after getting out of their planes." His brother Tirey built a prototype hangar house off Ford Road at the west end of the airfield to serve as an example for the airborne community of the future. Ford Road was orginally called "Adobe Road" because adobe bricks were made there. The name was changed by realtor Herbert Brownell to honor Ford, as the first major developer of the Village.

Following World War II it became apparent that there would not be a plane in every garage, so Ford had to adjust his enterprise, combining sales to plane owners with sales to home seekers. He enjoyed a brisk trade. Only two true hangar houses were ever built at Carmel Valley Airfield: Tirey's (which later burned), and one other, on the north side of the runway which was dismantled. During World War II, the airfield served as an alternative landing field for military planes flying out of Watsonville and King City. A clubhouse built for the Airpark later became an integral part of the Village's Blue Sky Lodge, which is still in operation today.

Geography
The Carmel Valley Village CDP comprises the main community of Carmel Valley on the northeast side of the Carmel River, as well as the community of Robles del Rio on the southwest side of the river.

The Carmel River flows northwest through the community, reaching the Pacific Ocean at the city of Carmel-by-the-Sea. Primary ecosystems of the vicinity include California oak woodland, riparian woodland, chaparral, grassland and savanna. Dominant oak trees include Quercus agrifolia. The locale of Carmel Valley is the northernmost range of the hybrid oak Quercus x alvordiana.

The Garland Ranch Regional Park is located at 700 West Carmel Valley Road. The Monterey Peninsula Regional Park District (MPRPD) manages the Garland Ranch Regional Park.

Climate
The region experiences warm dry summers, with no average monthly temperatures above , with heat waves in the upper 70s to 101 degrees F. the further inland you go. According to the Köppen Climate Classification system, Carmel Valley Village has a warm-summer Mediterranean climate, abbreviated "Csb" on climate maps.

Demographics

2010
At the 2010 census Carmel Valley Village had a population of 4,407. The racial makeup of Carmel Valley Village was 4,044 (91.8%) White, 21 (0.5%) African American, 22 (0.5%) Native American, 70 (1.6%) Asian, 11 (0.2%) Pacific Islander, 120 (2.7%) from other races, and 119 (2.7%) from two or more races. Hispanic or Latino of any race were 328 people (7.4%).

The census reported that 4,403 people (99.9% of the population) lived in households, 4 (0.1%) lived in non-institutionalized group quarters, and no one was institutionalized.

There were 1,895 households, 447 (23.6%) had children under the age of 18 living in them, 988 (52.1%) were opposite-sex married couples living together, 162 (8.5%) had a female householder with no husband present, 72 (3.8%) had a male householder with no wife present.  There were 104 (5.5%) unmarried opposite-sex partnerships, and 18 (0.9%) same-sex married couples or partnerships. 506 households (26.7%) were one person and 214 (11.3%) had someone living alone who was 65 or older. The average household size was 2.32.  There were 1,222 families (64.5% of households); the average family size was 2.77.

The age distribution was 763 people (17.3%) under the age of 18, 220 people (5.0%) aged 18 to 24, 726 people (16.5%) aged 25 to 44, 1,788 people (40.6%) aged 45 to 64, and 910 people (20.6%) who were 65 or older.  The median age was 51.7 years. For every 100 females, there were 93.8 males.  For every 100 females age 18 and over, there were 90.1 males.

There were 2,156 housing units at an average density of 112.4 per square mile, of the occupied units 1,326 (70.0%) were owner-occupied and 569 (30.0%) were rented. The homeowner vacancy rate was 2.4%; the rental vacancy rate was 5.6%.  3,214 people (72.9% of the population) lived in owner-occupied housing units and 1,189 people (27.0%) lived in rental housing units.

2000
At the 2000 census there were 4,700 people, 1,963 households, and 1,279 families in the CDP. The racial makeup of the CDP was 97.15% White, 0.38% African American, 0.38% Native American, 1.13% Asian, 0.11% Pacific Islander, 2.72% from other races, and 2.06% from two or more races. Hispanic or Latino of any race were 5.81%.

Of the 1,963 households 26.6% had children under the age of 18, 54.0% were married couples living together, 7.7% had a female householder with no husband present, and 34.8% were non-families. 26.0% of households were one person and 9.7% had someone who was 65 or older. The average household size was 2.39 and the average family size was 2.86.

The age distribution was 20.6% under the age of 18, 4.7% from 18 to 24, 22.5% from 25 to 44, 36.2% from 45 to 64, and 16.0% 65 or older. The median age was 46 years. For every 100 females, there were 94.8 males. For every 100 females age 18 and over, there were 92.2 males.

The median household income was $70,799 and the median family income was $85,191. Males had a median income of $56,083 versus $37,406 for females. The per capita income for the CDP was $42,991. About 3.1% of families and 3.9% of the population were below the poverty line, including 3.2% of those under age 18 and 5.1% of those age 65 or over.

Government

At the county level, Carmel Valley Village is represented on the Monterey County Board of Supervisors by Supervisor Mary Adams.

Tourism
Carmel Valley Village has a number of wine tasting rooms, as well as several high-end hotels affiliated with the wineries. Wineries with tasting rooms in Carmel Valley include Holman Ranch, Bernardus, Boëté, Chateau Sinnet, Folktale, Galante, Georis, Heller Estate, Joullian Village, Joyce Vineyards, Parsonage, San Saba and Talbott. A public bus, called the Grapevine Express Route 24 and run by Monterey-Salinas Transit, stops at most of these tasting rooms.

The Monterey Wine Trolley also offers a tour on a former San Francisco trolley that makes stops at several wineries in the Monterey Peninsula and Carmel Valley Village.

The Carmel Valley Community Park, the Carmel Valley Historical Society with public restrooms, and the Village Farmers' Market are located in the village off of Carmel Valley Road. The Carmel Valley Community Youth Center includes a community pool and parking lot on Ford Road.

Notable people 
 Beverly Cleary, children's book author
 Doris Day, singer, actress, animal activist
 Jesse Metcalfe, actor known for his role in John Tucker Must Die

See also
List of places in California (C)

References

External links
 
 Carmel Valley Village Improvement Committee

Census-designated places in Monterey County, California
Santa Lucia Range
Carmel Valley, California
Unincorporated communities in Monterey County, California
Unincorporated communities in California